A QAPF diagram is a double quasi-ternary diagram which is used to classify igneous rocks based on mineralogic composition. The acronym QAPF stands for "Quartz, Alkali feldspar, Plagioclase, Feldspathoid (Foid)". These are the mineral groups used for classification in QAPF diagram. Q, A, P and F percentages are normalized (recalculated so that their sum is 100%).

Origin
QAPF diagrams were created by the International Union of Geological Sciences (IUGS): Subcommission on the Systematics of Igneous Rocks
fostered by Albert Streckeisen (whence their alternative name: Streckeisen diagrams).
Geologists worldwide accept the diagrams as a classification of igneous, especially plutonic rocks.

Usage
QAPF diagrams are mostly used to classify plutonic rocks (phaneritic rocks), but are also used to classify volcanic rocks if modal mineralogical compositions have been determined. QAPF diagrams are not used to classify pyroclastic rocks or volcanic rocks if modal mineralogical composition is not determined, instead the TAS classification (Total-Alkali-Silica) is used. TAS is also used if volcanic rock contains volcanic glass (such as obsidian). QAPF diagrams are also not used if mafic minerals make up more than 90% of the rock composition (for example: peridotites and pyroxenites).

An exact name can be given only if the mineralogical composition is known, which cannot be determined in the field.

Reading QAPF diagram 
The QAPF diagram utilizes four minerals, or mineral groups, to classify igneous rocks. These  minerals are quartz (Q), Alkali feldspars (A), plagioclase feldspars (P), and feldspathoids (F). F and Q cannot form in plutonic rocks simultaneously due to the difference in their respective silica contents. Other minerals may occur in samples, but they are not utilized by this classification method.

The QAPF diagram is composed of two quasi-ternary plots (QAP and FAP) joined along one side. To use this classification method, the concentration (the mode) of these minerals must be determined and normalized to 100%.  

For a rock identified as having, say, 20% mica, 30% quartz (Q), 30% alkali feldspar (A) and 20% plagioclase (P), the mica is disregarded and the normalised ratios of Q, A and P are therefore 37.5%, 37.5% and 25% = 100%. Of these, the (again) normalised relative proportions of A and P are 37.5/62.5 = 60% and 25/62.5 = 40%. The rock can now be plotted on the diagram by finding a horizontal line representing 37.5% quartz and then plotting a point on it 60% of the way across from the A side to the P side. For this example the rock can be classified as a Monzogranite.

For example: a plutonic rock that contains no alkali feldspar and no feldspathoids, but contains many pyroxenes (unlabeled in QAPF diagram), plagioclase-feldspar, and few quartz grains is probably gabbro (located at the right edge of the diagram, near P). 

This diagram makes no distinction between rock types of the same QAPF plot position and classification, but different bulk chemical compositions with respect to other minerals such as olivine, Pyroxenes, amphiboles or micas. Because non Q, A, P and F minerals are disregarded, the system would not distinguish, for example, between gabbro, diorite, and anorthosite.

The QAPF diagram is not used for all plutonic rocks; ultramafic plutonic rocks are the most important group that have separate classification diagrams.

References

Further reading
Streckeisen, A. L., 1978. IUGS Subcommission on the Systematics of Igneous Rocks. Classification and Nomenclature of Volcanic Rocks, Lamprophyres, Carbonatites and Melilite Rocks. Recommendations and Suggestions. Neues Jahrbuch für Mineralogie, Abhandlungen, Vol. 141, 1–14.
Le Maitre,R.W. 2002. Igneous Rocks: A Classification and Glossary of Terms : Recommendations of International Union of Geological Sciences Subcommission on the Systematics of Igneous Rocks. Cambridge University Press, 236pp.

External links

Igneous petrology
Igneous rocks
Petrology